Abilene CityLink is the operator of public transportation in metropolitan Abilene, Texas. Service is provided six days per week along 8 regular routes, 6 Saturday routes, 1 shuttle, and on-call service.

Bus routes
2 ACU
3 Zoo/Pine
6 Mall
7 Southwest Wal-Mart
8 Dyess
9 Five Points
10 Willis/Mockingbird
12 Hendrick/Old Anson
Cisco Shuttle
On-Call Service
21 Northside Saturday
23 Zoo/Northeast Wal-Mart Saturday
26 Buffalo Gap/Mall Saturday
28 Southwest Wal-Mart Saturday
29 Westgate Saturday
30 Crosstown Saturday

Routes prior to June 4, 2018
1 Downtown Trolley (replaced by restructured Routes 2, 3, and 10)
2 ACU/Northeast Wal-Mart (restructured and renamed Route 2 ACU)
3 Radford Hills/Judge Ely (merged with the 13 Hickory/Pine to form 3 Zoo/Pine)
5 South Treadaway/Cisco (discontinued; later service to the area was brought back with a Route 10 extension, the Cisco Shuttle, and On-Call service)
6 Mall/ARMC (replaced by restructured Route 7)
7 Barrow/Southwest (restructured and renamed 7 Southwest Wal-Mart)
8 South 14th/South Clack (replaced by new Route 6 Mall and revised Route 7 Southwest Wal-Mart)
9 Westgate (split into 8 Dyess and 9 Five Points in June 2018)
10 North Willis (restructured and renamed 10 Willis/Mockingbird)
11 Grape/Mockingbird (merged with the 12 Hickory/Grape to form 12 Hendrick/Old Anson)
12 Hickory/Grape (merged with the 11 Grape & Mockingbird to form 12 Hendrick/Old Anson)
13 Hickory/Pine (merged with the 3 Radford Hills/Judge Ely to form 3 Zoo/Pine)
22 Judge Ely/Northeast Wal-Mart Saturday (restructured and renamed 23 Zoo/Northeast Wal-Mart Saturday)
26 Buffalo Gap/Mall Saturday
28 South 14th/Southwest Wal-Mart Saturday (renamed 28 Southwest Wal-Mart Saturday)
29 Westgate Saturday
30 Crosstown Ambler Saturday (restructured and renamed 30 Crosstown Saturday)
31 Grape/North 12th Saturday (replaced by new 21 Northside Saturday in June 2018)
32 Hickory Saturday (replaced by new 21 Northside Saturday and restructured Crosstown Ambler Saturday in June 2018)

Routes prior to January 4, 2010
1 North Willis (Renumbered Route 10)
2 Radford Hills (Restructured and renamed Route 3 Radford Hills/Judge Ely)
3 North Mockingbird (Restructured and renamed Route 11 Grape/Mockingbird)
4 South 7th (Discontinued in 2007/2008 as it duplicated Routes 6 and 10, with one portion being transferred to Route 6; restored on June 4, 2018 as Route 8 Dyess)
5 Hickory (Restructured and renamed Route 12 Hickory/Grape)
6 Westgate (Renumbered Route 9)
7 ACU (Split into Route 2 ACU/Northeast Wal-Mart and Route 13 Hickory/Pine)
8 South 14th (Restructured and renamed Route 8 South 14th/South Clack)
9 Mall/Cooper (Restructured and renamed Route 6 Mall/ARMC)
10 Mall/South Clack (Restructured and renamed Route 7 Barrow/Southwest)
11 Town Trolley (Renumbered Route 1)
12 State school (Restructured and renamed Route 5 South Treadaway/Cisco)

References

External links
 CityLink

Bus transportation in Texas
Abilene, Texas